Homopterus is a genus of beetles in the family Carabidae, containing the following species:

 Homopterus amplificatus Reichensperger, 1938 
 Homopterus arrowi Reichensperger, 1938 
 Homopterus bolivianus H.Kolbe, 1920 
 Homopterus brasiliensis (Westwood, 1838) 
 Homopterus cunctans Reichensperger, 1938 
 Homopterus honduriensis Darlington, 1937 
 Homopterus kriegi Reichensperger, 1938 
 Homopterus lunacarvalhoi Martinez & Jimenez-Asua, 1965 
 Homopterus martinezi Luna De Carvalho, 1963 
 Homopterus proemonens H.Kolbe, 1920 
 Homopterus steinbachi H.Kolbe, 1920 
 Homopterus subcordatus Darlington, 1950

References

Paussinae